Amiri Garibi ( Wealth and Poverty) is a 1990 Hindi-language drama film, produced by Pradeep Sharma under the TUTU Films banner and directed by Harmesh Malhotra. It stars Jeetendra, Rekha, Rishi Kapoor, Neelam, Raj Babbar, Poonam Dhillon and music composed by Laxmikant–Pyarelal. The film is a remake of the Telugu movie Makutamleni Maharaju (1987), starring Krishna, Sridevi, and Rajendra Prasad in the pivotal roles.

Plot
A wealthy Bombay-based industrialist Kedarnath (Om Shivpuri) travels to a small town where his childhood friend Narayan (Pran) resides. He meets with him, his wife Laxmi (Urmila Bhatt) and their daughter Rani (Poonam Dhillon). He proposes that Rani marries his son Rajesh (Raj Babbar) and move with him to the city. Narayan and Laxmi are overjoyed. Soon a marriage takes place. When Rani reaches Kedarnath's house, she is welcomed neither by her mother-in-law Sheela (Rohini Hattangadi), nor her husband and his sisters Jyoti (Neelam) and Pinky. She is ill-treated, belittled, slapped and humiliated on every possible occasion.

Then the unexpected happens, Jyoti happens to be a child bride, married to a poor Bhardwaj family. Now Deepak Bhardwaj (Rishi Kapoor) has grown up and has come to claim Jyoti as his wife and moves into their house, much to the chagrin of Jyoti, Rajesh, Pinky and Sheela. Tragedy follows as Kedarnath passes away, leaving Rani and Deepak to the mercy of Sheela, who loses no time in turning the tables on them and asking them to leave the house. She is now busy preparing Rajesh's marriage to a young woman named Sona (Rekha), who is not only rich but also beautiful and is ready to come to her home with a huge dowry. What Sheela does not know that Sona has her own agenda and plan, which do not include Sheela at all.

Cast

Jeetendra as Heera
Rekha as Sona
Rishi Kapoor as Deepak Bhardwaj
Neelam as Jyoti
Raj Babbar as Rajesh
Poonam Dhillon as Rani
Shakti Kapoor as Sher Singh
Pran as Narayan
Urmila Bhatt as Laxmi
Om Shivpuri as Kedarnath
Rohini Hattangadi as Sheela
Sushma Seth as Sona's Aunty
Chand Usmani as Radha
Jayshree Gadkar as Janki Bharadwaj
Yunus Parvez as Mahajan
Guddi Maruti às Baby , Rickshaw Passenger 
Lalita Kumari as Baby's Mom 
Rajesh Puri as Khairu
Dan Dhanoa as Jaggu
Gurbachan Singh as John

Soundtrack
The music of the film was composed by Laxmikant–Pyarelal while the lyrics were written by Anand Bakshi. Alka Yagnik and Shailendra Singh were the playback singers.

References

External links

1990s Hindi-language films
1990 films
Films scored by Laxmikant–Pyarelal
Hindi remakes of Telugu films
Indian drama films
Films directed by Harmesh Malhotra
Hindi-language drama films
1990 drama films